The 2002–03 Oregon Ducks men's basketball team competed in the Pac-10 Conference, achieving a record of 10-8 within the conference, and a record of 23-10 overall. The team was coached by Ernie Kent.

The Ducks were champions of the 2003 Pacific-10 Conference men's basketball tournament, beating USC in the final, 74-66. Oregon entered the 2003 NCAA Division I men's basketball tournament as a #8 seed in the Midwest Region. The team lost in the first round of the tournament, being upset by #9 Utah, 58-60.

Roster

Schedule and results

|-
!colspan=9 style=| Regular Season

|-
!colspan=9 style=| Pac-10 Tournament

|-
!colspan=9 style=| NCAA Tournament

Rankings

NBA draft

References

Oregon Ducks men's basketball seasons
Oregon
Oregon
Oregon
Oregon
Pac-12 Conference men's basketball tournament championship seasons